Malesco is a comune (municipality) in the Province of Verbano-Cusio-Ossola in the Italian region Piedmont, located about  northeast of Turin and about  north of Verbania, the provincial capital.

Malesco is the most populous comune in Val Vigezzo and has a station on the Domodossola–Locarno railway which runs along the valley. The neighbouring municipalities are: Cossogno, Craveggia, Re, Santa Maria Maggiore, Trontano, Valle Cannobina, Villette.

Demographic evolution

References

External links
 www.malesco.net/

Cities and towns in Piedmont